Callum Reid (born 9 September 1992 in Scotland) is a Scottish rugby union player who plays for  Boroughmuir RFC. He can play at Flanker or Number Eight.

Reid played for Edinburgh Academicals for many years. He left Accies in 2015 to play in New Zealand. He joined Boroughmuir RFC for the 2015-16 season.

He has represented Scotland at Under 20 level. He has also represented Scotland at Sevens.

He played for Glasgow Warriors as part of their 7s squad that won the Glasgow City Sevens in May 2013. They beat Glasgow Hawks 26-17 in the final. Reid scored a hat trick in the final.

He trained with Glasgow Warriors in the 2013-14 season.

External links
 ESPN rugby profile

References

1992 births
Living people
Scottish rugby union players
Glasgow Warriors players
Edinburgh Academicals rugby union players
Boroughmuir RFC players
Rugby union flankers